D. B. Bailey served as a member of the 1860-1861 California State Assembly, representing the 4th District.

References

Year of birth missing
Place of birth missing
Year of death missing
Place of death missing
Members of the California State Assembly